There were 2 female and 32 male athletes representing the country at the 2000 Summer Paralympics.

Medal table

References

Bibliography

External links
International Paralympic Committee

Nations at the 2000 Summer Paralympics
Paralympics
2000